Rumah limas ("limas house"), also known as rumah bari ("old house"), is a type of traditional house found in Palembang, South Sumatra, Indonesia. They can also be found in Baturaja. The house is traditionally built of wood and raised on stilts, with a stepped, or gradated, floor composed of two to five areas at slightly different  heights, with a broad porch, and a distinctive roof. In Palembang, these houses are associated with the nobility and other people of high status.

See also

Malay houses
Architecture of Indonesia
Rumah adat

Cited works

External links
Images of notable limas houses

Palembang
Architecture in Malaysia
Architecture in Indonesia
Rumah adat